Nicolas Solimele (died 1492) was a Roman Catholic prelate who served as Bishop of Venosa (1459–1492) and Bishop of Acerno (1436–1459).

Biography
On 7 August 1436, Nicolas Solimele was appointed by Pope Eugene IV as Bishop of Acerno.

On 17 October 1459, he was transferred by Pope Pius II to the diocese of Venosa. 
He served as Bishop of Venosa until his death in 1492. 

While bishop, he was the principal consecrator of Carlo Setari, Bishop of Isernia (1470); and the co-consecrator of João Manuel, Bishop of Ceuta (1444).

References

External links and additional sources
 (for Chronology of Bishops) 

15th-century Italian Roman Catholic bishops
Bishops appointed by Pope Eugene IV
Bishops appointed by Pope Pius II
1492 deaths